Sri Hargobindpur Assembly constituency (Sl. No.: 8) is a Punjab Legislative Assembly constituency in Gurdaspur district, Punjab state, India.

Members of Legislative Assembly
 2012: Des Raj Dhugga, Shiromani Akali Dal

Election results

2022

2017

References

External links
  

Assembly constituencies of Punjab, India
Gurdaspur district